Isidoro Goldberger (born 1892) was a German-born Spanish cinematographer who worked on around thirty films during his career. In 1949 he worked on In a Corner of Spain, the first Spanish film in colour which used the Cinefotocolor process. He was the brother of Willy Goldberger, who was also a cinematographer.

Selected filmography
 The Wildcat (1936)
 Journey to Nowhere (1942)
 A Palace for Sale (1942)
 In a Corner of Spain (1949)
 Closed Exit (1955)

References

Bibliography
 Bentley, Bernard. A Companion to Spanish Cinema. Boydell & Brewer 2008.

External links

1892 births
Year of death unknown
German emigrants to Spain
Spanish cinematographers